Gausfred II (died 1074) was the count of Roussillon from 1013 or 1014 to his death. He was the son and successor of Count Giselbert I, who was also count of Empúries, and Beliarda.

As soon as he ascended the throne, he had to confront an invasion by his uncle Hugh I of Empúries. This was the culmination of years of disputes between Hugh and Giselbert, heirs of Gausfred I, who divided his lands between his sons. Hugh and Gausfred II signed a peace treaty ending the wars and litigations in 1020.

Around 1040, when Hugh died, Gausfred and his son Giselbert took advantage of his son and successor Ponç and invaded the country. They pillaged as they went and sacked Empúries itself.

1074 deaths
Year of birth unknown
10th-century Visigothic people
11th-century Visigothic people